1973 London bombing may refer to:

1973 Old Bailey bombing
King's Cross station and Euston station bombings
1973 Westminster bombing
December 1973 North Star pub bombing